The forty-third Connecticut House of Representatives district elects one member of the Connecticut House of Representatives. Its current representative is Republican Greg Howard, elected in 2021.

List of representatives

Recent elections

External links 
 Google Maps - Connecticut House Districts

References

43
Stonington, Connecticut
North Stonington, Connecticut